Haiwai may refer to:
Another spelling of the unincorporated community of Haiwee, California
Beijing Haidian Foreign Language Shi Yan School, nicknamed "Haiwai"
QQ Haiwai, an international real estate listings website run by Tencent

See also
Overseas Chinese
Haiwei, a given name
Hawaii, a U.S. state